The Gamon, later Grace Baronetcy, of Minchenden House in the County of Middlesex, was a title in the Baronetage of Great Britain. It was created on 11 May 1795 for Richard Gamon, for many years Member of Parliament for Winchester, with remainder in default of male issue of his own to his cousin Richard Grace MP. The latter was a member of the Irish House of Commons for Baltimore. Gamon was succeeded according to the special remainder by William Grace, the second Baronet, the son of Richard Grace. 

Gamon's father, also Richard, was married to Elizabeth Grace. The Grace family were descended from Oliver Grace (d.1708) of Shanganagh, Rathaspick, Queens County, who was appointed Chief Remembrancer of the Exchequer of Ireland and was elected MP for Ballinakill, Queens County. 

The fourth Baronet was appointed High Sheriff of County Dublin in 1888 and High Sheriff of Queen's County in 1892.  The fifth Baronet was also High Sheriff of Queen's County in 1907.

The title became extinct on the death of the sixth Baronet in 1977.

Gamon, later Grace baronets, of Minchenden House (1795)
Sir Richard Grace Gamon, 1st Baronet (1748–1818)
Sir William Grace, 2nd Baronet (died 1841)
Sir William Grace, 3rd Baronet (1817–1887)
Sir Percy Raymond Grace, 4th Baronet (1831–1903)
Sir Valentine Raymond Grace, 5th Baronet (1877–1945)
Sir Raymond Eustace Grace, 6th Baronet (1903–1977)

References

Extinct baronetcies in the Baronetage of Great Britain
Baronetcies created with special remainders